Lansdowne is a community in Yukon, Canada. It in the middle of Tagish Road in between the Klondike and Alaska highways. It is close to Conrad and Carcross.

References

Unincorporated communities in Yukon